Brachodes gressitti is a moth of the family Brachodidae that is  endemic to Chinese province of Hainan.

References

External links

Moths described in 2009
Endemic fauna of Hainan
Moths of Asia
gressitti